The 2021–22 FA Cup was the 141st season and marks the 150th anniversary of the first Football Association Challenge Cup, the second oldest football tournament in the world, started in the 1871–72 season. It was sponsored by Emirates and was known as the Emirates FA Cup for sponsorship purposes. The winners qualified for the 2022–23 UEFA Europa League group stage.

Premier League side Leicester City were the holders, having beaten Chelsea in the 2021 FA Cup Final. They were eliminated by Nottingham Forest in the fourth round.

Liverpool beat the two-time defending runners-up Chelsea on penalties in the final to win their 8th FA Cup overall and first since 2006. This was the fifth FA Cup final that has gone to extra time, with Chelsea becoming the first team to lose three consecutive finals.

Teams
The FA Cup is a knockout competition with 124 teams taking part (excluding those eliminated in the qualifying rounds) all trying to reach the Final at Wembley in May 2022. The competitors consist of the 92 teams from the Football League system (20 teams from the Premier League and the 72 in total from the EFL Championship, EFL League One and EFL League Two) plus the 32 surviving teams out of 637 teams from the National League System (levels 5–10 of the English football league system) that started the competition in qualifying rounds.

All rounds are drawn randomly, usually either at the completion of the previous round or on the evening of the last televised game of a round being played, depending on television broadcasting rights.

Qualifying

Teams that are not members of either the Premier League or English Football League competed in the qualifying rounds to secure one of 32 available places in the First Round Proper. The six-round qualifying competition began with the Extra Preliminary Round on 6 August 2021.

First Round Proper
The first round saw the 32 winners from the fourth qualifying round joined by the 48 clubs from League One and League Two. The draw was held on 17 October 2021 at Wembley Stadium, and was done by Kelly Smith and Wes Morgan. The lowest-ranked team in the first round were AFC Sudbury of the eighth-tier Isthmian League North Division.

Second Round Proper
The second round featured the 40 winners from the first round. The draw was held on 8 November 2021 at Wembley Stadium, and was done by Shaun Wright-Phillips and Rachel Yankey. The lowest-ranked team in the second round were Buxton of the seventh-tier Northern Premier League Premier Division.

Third Round Proper 
The third round featured all 44 clubs across the Premier League and the Championship, who entered the competition in this round, along with the 20 winners from the second round. The draw was held on 6 December 2021 at Wembley Stadium, and was done by David Seaman and Faye White.
The lowest-ranked team in the third round were Kidderminster Harriers of the sixth-tier National League North. To avoid possible fixture congestion caused by postponements to league matches due to a surge in COVID-19 cases, matches from this round onwards are decided on the day, with extra time and penalties used if necessary.

Fourth Round Proper
The draw for the fourth round was held on 9 January 2022 at Wembley Stadium, and was done by David James and Leah Williamson. The lowest-ranked team in the fourth round were Kidderminster Harriers of the sixth-tier National League North.

Fifth Round Proper
The draw for the fifth round was held on 6 February 2022 at Wembley Stadium, and was done by Andy Cole. The matches were played during the week commencing Monday 28 February 2022. The lowest-ranked team in the fifth round were Boreham Wood of the fifth-tier National League.

Quarter-finals
The draw was held on 3 March 2022 at Wembley Stadium, and was conducted by England national football team manager Gareth Southgate. The lowest-ranked teams in the quarter-finals were Middlesbrough and Nottingham Forest, both of the second-tier EFL Championship.

On 15 March, Chelsea requested to play their game against Middlesbrough behind closed doors, due to them being unable to sell any more than the season tickets and 500–600 regular tickets sold before 10 March, after the Russian owner Roman Abramovich was sanctioned by the UK over his links to Vladimir Putin. This would have meant no one would be able to attend, including Middlesbrough fans whose tickets already had sold out. Chelsea's request was withdrawn the same day under criticism from the FA and Middlesbrough.

Semi-finals
The draw for the semi-finals was held on 20 March 2022 by former England international Robbie Fowler.

Final

Top scorers

Television rights in the United Kingdom

Broadcast partners for other countries can be found on the FA's website.

References

 
FA Cup seasons
FA Cup
FA Cup